19th Avenue/Dunlap is a station on the Valley Metro light rail line in Phoenix, Arizona. It was opened as part of Phase 1 of the Northwest Extension of the system on March 19, 2016, and will remain the end of the line until 2024, when Phase 2 extends the line to Metrocenter.

References

External links
 Valley Metro map
 Northwest Light Rail Extension Opens

2016 establishments in Arizona
Railway stations in the United States opened in 2016
Valley Metro Rail stations in Phoenix, Arizona